In molecular biology, SUMO (Small Ubiquitin-like Modifier) proteins are a family of small proteins that are covalently attached to and detached from other proteins in cells to modify their function. This process is called SUMOylation (sometimes written sumoylation). SUMOylation is a post-translational modification involved in various cellular processes, such as nuclear-cytosolic transport, transcriptional regulation, apoptosis, protein stability, response to stress, and progression through the cell cycle.

SUMO proteins are similar to ubiquitin and are considered members of the ubiquitin-like protein family. SUMOylation is directed by an enzymatic cascade analogous to that involved in ubiquitination. In contrast to ubiquitin, SUMO is not used to tag proteins for degradation. Mature SUMO is produced when the last four amino acids of the C-terminus have been cleaved off to allow formation of an isopeptide bond between the C-terminal glycine residue of SUMO and an acceptor lysine on the target protein.

SUMO family members often have dissimilar names; the SUMO homologue in yeast, for example, is called SMT3 (suppressor of mif two 3). Several pseudogenes have been reported for SUMO genes in the human genome.

Function 

SUMO modification of proteins has many functions. Among the most frequent and best studied are protein stability, nuclear-cytosolic transport, and transcriptional regulation. Typically, only a small fraction of a given protein is SUMOylated and this modification is rapidly reversed by the action of deSUMOylating enzymes. SUMOylation of target proteins has been shown to cause a number of different outcomes including altered localization and binding partners. The SUMO-1 modification of RanGAP1 (the first identified SUMO substrate) leads to its trafficking from cytosol to nuclear pore complex. The SUMO modification of ninein leads to its movement from the centrosome to the nucleus. In many cases, SUMO modification of transcriptional regulators correlates with inhibition of transcription. One can refer to the GeneRIFs of the SUMO proteins, e.g. human SUMO-1, to find out more.

There are 4 confirmed SUMO isoforms in humans; SUMO-1, SUMO-2, SUMO-3 and SUMO-4. At the amino acid level, SUMO1 is about 50% identical to SUMO2. SUMO-2/3 show a high degree of similarity to each other and are distinct from SUMO-1. SUMO-4 shows similarity to SUMO-2/3 but differs in having a Proline instead of Glutamine at position 90. As a result, SUMO-4 isn't processed and conjugated under normal conditions, but is used for modification of proteins under stress-conditions like starvation. During mitosis, SUMO-2/3 localize to centromeres and condensed chromosomes, whereas SUMO-1 localizes to the mitotic spindle and spindle midzone, indicating that SUMO paralogs regulate distinct mitotic processes in mammalian cells. One of the major SUMO conjugation products associated with mitotic chromosomes arose from SUMO-2/3 conjugation of topoisomerase II, which is modified exclusively by SUMO-2/3 during mitosis. SUMO-2/3 modifications seem to be involved specifically in the stress response. SUMO-1 and SUMO-2/3 can form mixed chains, however, because SUMO-1 does not contain the internal SUMO consensus sites found in SUMO-2/3, it is thought to terminate these poly-SUMO chains.
Serine 2 of SUMO-1 is phosphorylated, raising the concept of a 'modified modifier'.

DNA damage response

Cellular DNA is regularly exposed to DNA damaging agents.  A DNA damage response (DDR) that is well regulated and intricate is usually employed to deal with the potential deleterious effects of the damage.  When DNA damage occurs, SUMO protein has been shown to act as a molecular glue to facilitate the assembly of large protein complexes in repair foci.  Also, SUMOylation can alter a protein's biochemical activities and interactions.  SUMOylation plays a role in the major DNA repair pathways of base excision repair, nucleotide excision repair, non-homologous end joining and homologous recombinational repair.  SUMOylation also facilitates error prone translesion synthesis.

Structure 

SUMO proteins are small; most are around 100 amino acids in length and 12 kDa in mass. The exact length and mass varies between SUMO family members and depends on which organism the protein comes from. Although SUMO has very little sequence identity with ubiquitin (less than 20%) at the amino acid level, it has a nearly identical structural fold. SUMO protein has a unique N-terminal extension of 10-25 amino acids which other ubiquitin-like proteins do not have. This N-terminal is found related to the formation of SUMO chains.

The structure of human SUMO1 is depicted on the right. It shows SUMO1 as a globular protein with both ends of the amino acid chain (shown in red and blue) sticking out of the protein's centre. The spherical core consists of an alpha helix and a beta sheet. The diagrams shown are based on an NMR analysis of the protein in solution.

Prediction of SUMO attachment

Most SUMO-modified proteins contain the tetrapeptide consensus motif Ψ-K-x-D/E where Ψ is a hydrophobic residue, K is the lysine conjugated to SUMO, x is any amino acid (aa), D or E is an acidic residue. Substrate specificity appears to be derived directly from Ubc9 and the respective substrate motif. Currently available prediction programs are:
 SUMOplot - online free access software developed to predict the probability for the SUMO consensus sequence (SUMO-CS) to be engaged in SUMO attachment. The SUMOplot score system is based on two criteria: 1) direct amino acid match to the SUMO-CS observed and shown to bind Ubc9, and 2) substitution of the consensus amino acid residues with amino acid residues exhibiting similar hydrophobicity. SUMOplot has been used in the past to predict Ubc9 dependent sites.
 seeSUMO - uses random forests and support vector machines trained on the data collected from the literature
 SUMOsp - uses PSSM to score potential SUMOylation peptide stites. It can predict sites followed the ψKXE motif and unusual SUMOylation sites contained other non-canonical motifs.
 JASSA - online free access predictor of SUMOylation sites (classical and inverted consensus) and SIMs (SUMO interacting motif). JASSA uses a scoring system based on a Position Frequency Matrix derived from the alignment of experimental SUMOylation sites or SIMs. Novel features were implemented towards a better evaluation of the prediction, including identification of database hits matching the query sequence and representation of candidate sites within the secondary structural elements and/or the 3D fold of the protein of interest, retrievable from deposited PDB files.

SUMO attachment (SUMOylation) 

SUMO attachment to its target is similar to that of ubiquitin (as it is for the other ubiquitin-like proteins such as NEDD 8). The SUMO precursor has some extra amino acids that need to be removed, therefore a C-terminal peptide is cleaved from the SUMO precursor by a protease (in human these are the SENP proteases or Ulp1 in yeast) to reveal a di-glycine motif. The obtained SUMO then becomes bound to an E1 enzyme (SUMO Activating Enzyme (SAE)) which is a heterodimer (subunits SAE1 and SAE2). It is then passed to an E2, which is a conjugating enzyme (Ubc9). Finally, one of a small number of E3 ligating proteins attaches it to the protein.  In yeast, there are four SUMO E3 proteins, Cst9, Mms21, Siz1 and Siz2. While in ubiquitination an E3 is essential to add ubiquitin to its target, evidence suggests that the E2 is sufficient in SUMOylation as long as the consensus sequence is present. It is thought that the E3 ligase promotes the efficiency of SUMOylation and in some cases has been shown to direct SUMO conjugation onto non-consensus motifs. E3 enzymes can be largely classed into PIAS proteins, such as Mms21 (a member of the Smc5/6 complex) and Pias-gamma and HECT proteins. On Chromosome 17 of the human genome, SUMO2 is near SUMO1+E1/E2 and SUMO2+E1/E2, among various others. Some E3's, such as RanBP2, however, are neither. Recent evidence has shown that PIAS-gamma is required for the SUMOylation of the transcription factor yy1 but it is independent of the zinc-RING finger (identified as the functional domain of the E3 ligases). SUMOylation is reversible and is removed from targets by specific SUMO proteases. In budding yeast, the Ulp1 SUMO protease is found bound at the nuclear pore, whereas Ulp2 is nucleoplasmic. The distinct subnuclear localisation of deSUMOylating enzymes is conserved in higher eukaryotes.

DeSUMOylation 
SUMO can be removed from its substrate, which is called deSUMOylation. Specific proteases mediate this procedure (SENP in human or Ulp1 and Ulp2 in yeast).

Role in protein purification 
Recombinant proteins expressed in E. coli may fail to fold properly, instead forming aggregates and precipitating as inclusion bodies. This insolubility may be due to the presence of codons read inefficiently by E. coli, differences in eukaryotic and prokaryotic ribosomes, or lack of appropriate molecular chaperones for proper protein folding. In order to purify such proteins it may be necessary to fuse the protein of interest with a solubility tag such as SUMO or MBP (maltose-binding protein) to increase the protein's solubility. SUMO can later be cleaved from the protein of interest using a SUMO-specific protease such as Ulp1 peptidase.

Human SUMO proteins 

 SUMO1
 SUMO2
 SUMO3
 SUMO4

See also 
Ubiquitin
Prokaryotic ubiquitin-like protein

References

Further reading

External links 
 SUMO1 homology group from HomoloGene
 human SUMO proteins on ExPASy: SUMO1 SUMO2 SUMO3 SUMO4

Programs for prediction SUMOylation:
 SUMOplot Analysis Program — predicts and scores SUMOylation sites in your protein (by Abgent)
 seeSUMO - prediction of SUMOylation sites
 SUMOsp - prediction of SUMOylation sites
 JASSA - Predicts and scores SUMOylation sites and SIM (SUMO interacting motif)

Research laboratories

Post-translational modification
Proteins